Ryan Paul Taylor (born 4 May 1988) is an English professional footballer plays as a striker for EFL League Two side Grimsby Town.

He has previously played for Rotherham United, Burton Albion, Exeter City, Bristol City, Portsmouth, Oxford United, Plymouth Argyle and Newport County.

Career

Rotherham United and loans
Born in Rotherham, South Yorkshire, Taylor began his career as a trainee at Rotherham United in July 2005, making his first-team debut as an 81st-minute substitute in a 1–0 home defeat to Swindon Town. He made twelve first-team appearances in the 2006–07 season before glandular fever ruled him out for the rest of the season in November 2006.

Following Rotherham's relegation to League Two at the end of the 2006–07 season, he signed a new two-year contract, and then joined Conference National side Burton Albion on a one-month loan in September 2007. On his return to Rotherham, he established himself in the first team and scored his first goal for Rotherham in a 2–0 win over Shrewsbury Town in November 2007. By the end of the 2007–08 season, Taylor had made 38 appearances for Rotherham, scoring six goals.

Mark Robins twice extended Taylor's contract: in May 2008 and then the following year, each time by one year. This surprised some supporters and critics, who questioned Robins' persistence with the young striker. Ronnie Moore again took charge of the Millers at the start of the 2009–10 season, by which time Taylor had scored 10 goals in almost 100 appearances, sending him out on loan to Exeter City.

Taylor made an immediate impact to the Exeter squad, helping them avoid relegation and receiving Man of the Match awards on several occasions. He returned to his hometown club in time for the play-off finals, where he went straight into the starting line up on the strength of his performances at Exeter, and scored two goals in the final at Wembley.

Bristol City
On 20 June 2011, Taylor signed a three-year deal with Championship side Bristol City for an undisclosed fee. He made his Robins debut on 17 August, but in a 1–2 loss to Leicester City; Taylor netted his first goal for the club on 28 April 2012, in a 1–1 away draw against Burnley.

Despite featuring more regularly in his second season, Taylor failed to make an impression and left the club in January 2014, with the Robins being relegated to League One in the process.

Portsmouth
On 9 January 2014, Taylor left Bristol City and signed an 18-month deal with League Two side Portsmouth, being handed the number 20 shirt. He made his debut for Pompey two days later, starting in a 0–0 draw against Oxford United. On 24 February 2015, Taylor scored two goals in the last 10 minutes to ensure Pompey's comeback against Tranmere Rovers and guide them to a 3–2 win, after Pompey had trailed 0–2.

Oxford United
On 26 May 2015, Taylor signed for fellow League Two side Oxford United on a two-year deal. He was a first-team regular during the first half of the 2015–16 season, but missed the second half through injury, at the end of which Oxford were promoted to League One. He returned to regular first-team appearances the following season, though often as a substitute. His contract was ended by mutual consent at the end of the January transfer window in 2017, and he signed immediately for Plymouth Argyle, promotion-chasers in League Two. In his one and a half seasons with Oxford, he scored 4 league goals in 43 appearances (19 as substitute), 3 FA Cup goals and once in the Football League Trophy.

Plymouth Argyle
On 30 January 2017, Taylor signed for League Two side Plymouth Argyle on a free transfer. The 28-year-old forward became Derek Adams' fourth signing of the January transfer window to further bolster the Pilgrims' attacking options going into the crucial final part of their promotion challenge. Taylor made his debut for Argyle on 4 February during a 1–0 away win against Cambridge United, and scored his first goal for the club on his home debut, a 3–0 victory over local rivals Exeter City on 11 February.

Taylor re-signed for Plymouth Argyle at the end of the 2017–18 season. His contract was not renewed by Plymouth at the end of the COVID-19 affected 2019–20 season.

Newport County
On 20 August 2020 Taylor joined Newport County on a one-year deal. He made his debut for Newport on 5 September 2020 as a second-half substitute in the 2–0 EFL Cup win against Swansea City. He scored his first goal for Newport on 12 September 2020 in the 1–1 draw against Scunthorpe United on the first day of the 2020–21 League Two season. Taylor played for Newport in the League Two playoff final at Wembley Stadium on 31 May 2021 which Newport lost to Morecambe, 1-0 after a 107th-minute penalty. On 4 June 2021 it was announced that he would leave Newport County at the end of the season, following the expiry of his contract.

Grimsby Town
On 22 June 2021, Taylor joined Grimsby Town on a one-year contract.

Taylor played in the 2022 National League play-off Final as Grimsby beat Solihull Moors 2–1 at the London Stadium to return to the Football League.

On 24 June 2022, Grimsby announced Taylor has signed a new one-year contract of their 2022–23 EFL League Two campaign.

Career statistics

Honours
Rotherham United
League Two play-off finalists 2009–10

Newport County
League Two play-off finalists 2020–21

Grimsby Town
National League play-off winners: 2022

References

External links

1988 births
Living people
Footballers from Rotherham
English footballers
Association football forwards
Rotherham United F.C. players
Burton Albion F.C. players
Exeter City F.C. players
Bristol City F.C. players
Portsmouth F.C. players
Plymouth Argyle F.C. players
English Football League players
Oxford United F.C. players
Newport County A.F.C. players
Grimsby Town F.C. players